The Hakuba salamander or Japanese mountain salamander (Hynobius hidamontanus) is a species of salamander in the family Hynobiidae. This salamander is also synonymous with the mountain salamander (Hynobius tenuis). It is endemic to Japan. Its natural habitats are temperate forests, rivers, swamps, freshwater springs, and plantations. It is threatened by habitat loss.

References

 Nambu, H., 1991. Hynobius tenuis (Caudata, Hynobiidae), a new species of salamander from Central Japan. Zoological Science, 8(5): 991–997.

Hynobius
Amphibians described in 1987
Endemic amphibians of Japan
Taxonomy articles created by Polbot
Taxa named by Masafumi Matsui